Kjøra is a village in the municipality of Orkland in Trøndelag county, Norway. The village is located along the Trondheimsfjord in the Geitastrand area of the municipality.

References

Orkland
Villages in Trøndelag